Pejman Salimpour is an Iranian-American physician, professor, and business executive. He is the co-founder of both CareNex Health Services (now part of Anthem and Plymouth Health, the latter of which previously owned Alvarado Hospital in San Diego, California. Salimpour is credited as the lead physician in a campaign that successfully challenged the legality of certain exclusivity agreements between hospitals and doctors' groups, opening hospitals to more physician specialists and enabled patients to be seen by physicians of their choice.

Early life and education

Salimpour was born in England and grew up in Tehran, Iran along with two sisters and younger brother Pedram Salimpour. His father was a pediatrician and the family lived in a Persian Jewish community during the Iranian Revolution in the late 1970s. Amid escalating violence, Salimpour immigrated to the United States. He was 17 years old at the time and moved to Philadelphia to live with an uncle who immigrated to the United States a few years prior. Salimpour taught himself English by spending his nights at a library, reading books in English and translating them into Persian by looking up each word in a dictionary.

Salimpour's family immigrated to the United States about six months after he did, settling the family in Los Angeles, California. His father started working at Cedars-Sinai Medical Center and eventually opened up a pediatric office in the area. Salimpour attended the University of California Los Angeles where he earned a bachelor's degree in chemistry in 1983. He moved on to Washington University School of Medicine where he earned his medical degree in 1987 before completing his residency at Harbor–UCLA Medical Center in 1990.

Career

In the field of medicine, Salimpour has been a practicing physician, professor, business executive and owner of medical facilities. As a physician, he practices part-time in the Salimpour Pediatric Medical Group, the practice founded by his father, and he previously served as chief of pediatrics at Cedars-Sinai Medical Center in Los Angeles.

Salimpour first gained national attention for his work in the medical field in the mid-1990s when he led an initiative that fought exclusivity contracts that hospitals had with physicians. These agreements barred competing physicians from caring for patients at the hospitals, limiting patient's choices of physicians who could care for them. Salimpour's efforts on patients' behalf began after he was informed by Providence Saint Joseph Medical Center that his patients could not be seen by any neonatologists from his practice. He had developed a practice that included perinatologists who treat high-risk pregnancies as well as neonatologists who treated the sickest newborns.

As part of his campaign, Salimpour led other physicians, nurses, the California Medical Association to petition the California State Legislature and the California Health and Human Services Agency. After a two-year fight that included lobbying lawmakers and the filing of an anti-trust lawsuit, hospitals were made to allow neonatologists to see patients in hospitals that received state funding, regardless of exclusivity agreements. With this change, patients had the right to be seen by the physician of their choice, regardless of any attempt by a hospital to limit which physicians could practice at their facility. 

Salimpour's work as a business executive and entrepreneur in the field of medicine including the co-founding of two medical companies and co-ownership of one of San Diego's largest hospitals. He is the co-founder of CareNex Health Services, a health-care technology company that specializes in neonatal and perinatal disease management. The company was founded in 2005 along with his brother Pedram and was acquired by WellPoint (now Anthem) in 2013. The brothers also founded the physician-owned company Plymouth Health, formed specifically for the purpose of acquiring Alvarado Hospital Medical Center in San Diego, California. Prior to the purchase, the hospital was owned by Tenet Healthcare Corporation which was accused of paying kickbacks to physicians for referrals to the hospital. Tenet settled a civil complaint filed against them, which included a $21 million settlement and agreement to either close or sell the hospital. Salimpour and his company closed on the purchase in 2007, paying approximately $36.5 million for the hospital. He invested millions of dollars to upgrade the hospital's equipment and bring in some of the nation's top physicians. He made the decision to sell the hospital to Prime Healthcare Services in 2010.

Salimpour served as a statesman in 2005 with a White House appointment to serve on the National Latino Healthcare Task Force and the United States Small Business Administration National Advisory Council. Outside of government appointments, he was elected to the board of directors for the American Academy of Pediatrics (California Chapter) and the Los Angeles County Medical Association. He is also a member of the House of Delegates of the California Medical Association as well as a board member of the California Medical Association Political Action Committee.

Salimpour is also an educator, working as a professor of clinical pediatrics at the University of California Los Angeles School of Medicine. His work in the field of medical education led him to write Photographic Atlas of Pediatric Disorders and Diagnosis, a book that he co-authored with his brother Pedram and his father Ralph Salimpour.

Awards and recognition

Salimpour has been recognized by numerous organizations for his work. He received a Distinguished Record of Service Commendation from former California Governor Gray Davis for his work with children in the State of California. In 2012 he was honored with an Alumni Achievement Award from the Washington University School of Medicine and in 2014 he was listed as one of Hollywood's Top Doctors by The Hollywood Reporter. He has been listed as a "SuperDoctor" by L.A. Magazine for five consecutive years beginning in 2010.

Personal life

Salimpour is involved in philanthropy efforts related to his field. He is the co-founder of NexCare Collaborative, a 501c3 organization that helps find affordable health insurance for poor families in the Los Angeles area. It also provides free referral services for foster children to have access to needed medical services. Also known as First 5 LA Connect, the Collaborative provides a call-in line with bilingual staffers who help assist those needing affordable health care or referrals.

Salimpour is married to Daphna Salimpour, an architect and interior designer, with whom he has three daughters.

References

External links
 Plymouth Health official website

Living people
American people of Iranian descent
Washington University School of Medicine alumni
University of California, Los Angeles alumni
Physicians from California
Year of birth missing (living people)
Washington University in St. Louis alumni